Transgogol Rural LLG is a local-level government (LLG) of Madang Province, Papua New Guinea.

Wards
01. Melowaba
02. Gumaru Mawan
03. Amaimon (Amaimon language speakers)
04. Baisarik
05. Bemari Waguma
06. Garinam
07. Barum
08. Buroa
09. Butade
10. Kagi
11. Ensuda
12. Bai
13. Dawa Bigawa
14. Babaran Imam
15. Kosilanta
16. Abiya

References

Local-level governments of Madang Province